The men's 4 × 100 metres relay event at the 2019 European Athletics U23 Championships was held in Gävle, Sweden, at Gavlehov Stadium Park on 14 July.

Medalists

*Athletes who ran in heats only

Results

Heats
Qualification rule: First 3 in each heat (Q) and the next 2 fastest (q) qualified for the final.

Final

References

4 x 100 metres relay
Relays at the European Athletics U23 Championships